A gunpowder mill is a mill where gunpowder is made.

Gunpowder Mills may refer to:

Europe 
 Ballincollig Royal Gunpowder Mills in Ireland
 Faversham Royal Gunpowder Mills in England
 Waltham Abbey Royal Gunpowder Mills in England
 Low Wood Gunpowder Works in Furness, England
 Littleton gunpowder works in Somerset, England
 Camilty Gunpowder Mills in West Lothian, Scotland

USA 
California Powder Works in California
Hazard Powder Company in Connecticut
Eleutherian Mills in Delaware
Confederate Powderworks in Georgia
Oriental Powder Company in Maine
American Powder Mills in Massachusetts
Laflin & Rand Powder Company in New York
Austin Powder Company in Ohio
Miami Powder Company in Ohio
Frankford Powder-Mill in Pennsylvania